Kongbrailatpam Manjit Sharma (born 3 March 1996) is an Indian professional football player who plays as a defender for I-League club Sudeva Delhi.

Early life 
Sharma was born on 3 March 1996 in India's northeastern state of Manipur.

Career

NEROCA FC

2019-20 
Sharma signed his first senior contract with I-League side NEROCA F.C. He would represent the club in 2019-20 I-League season. Sharma played his debut match on 14 March 2020 against Chennai City F.C. Sharma was started in the lineup for the match. He played the full 90 minutes. The game finished in a 2–2 draw. Sharma played just one game in total for the club at the end of the season.

2020-21 
Sharma stayed with club for the 2020-21 I-League season. He played his first match of the season on 15 January 2021 against TRAU FC in a 1–1 draw as a substitute for Khaiminthang Lhungdim. He started in the lineup for the first time the season against Mohammedan SC on 3 February which ended in a 0–0 draw.

Club statistics

Club

References

External links 
 
 
 

1996 births
Living people
Indian footballers
NEROCA FC players
I-League players
Association football defenders
Footballers from Manipur